The name Ingvar is an Old Norse first name for men common in Scandinavia meaning "protected by Yngvi". The feminine version of the name is Inga.

The first element of the name is derived from Proto-Norse *Ing(w)ia (Ingi-), Norse Yngvi, who is better known by the title Freyr "Lord". The second element is probably either *harjaz (warrior) or *warjaz (defender). The name consequently either meant Freyr's warrior or Freyr's defender.

Igor (Russian Igor, Ukrainian Ihor, Belarusian Ihar) is a given name derived from the Scandinavian name Ingvar that was brought to ancient Kievan Rus' by the Vikings. Igor, son of Rurik, conquered Kiev.

Old English sources suggest that the birth-name of Ivar the Boneless might have been Ingvar; he is referred to as Hyngvar, Hingvar and Inguar in the English annals.

People

First name
Ingvar, Swedish ruler
Ingvar the Far-Travelled, 11th century Swedish viking
Ingvar of Kiev, 13th century monarch of Kiev
Ingvar Ambjørnsen (born 1956), Norwegian writer
Ingvar Bengtsson (1922–2001), Swedish athlete
Ingvar Carlsson (born 1934), Swedish politician
Ingvar Eggert Sigurðsson (born 1963), Icelandic actor 
Ingvar Ericsson, multiple people
Ingvar Gärd (1921–2006), Swedish football player
Ingvar Jónsson (born 1989), Icelandic football player
Ingvar Kamprad (1926–2018), Swedish businessman
Ingvar Lindell (1904–1993), Swedish jurist and politician
Ingvar Oldsberg (1945–2022), Swedish television presenter and sports journalist
Ingvar Pettersson, multiple people
Ingvar Rydell (1922–2013), Swedish football player
Ingvar Skogsberg (born 1937), Swedish film director and screenwriter
Ingvar Svensson, multiple people

Middle name
John Ingvar Lövgren (1930–2002), Swedish murderer

Icelandic masculine given names
Swedish masculine given names
Norwegian masculine given names
Scandinavian masculine given names